The Reading Fire Department provides fire protection and emergency medical services to the city of Reading, Pennsylvania.

History
The Reading Fire Department was formed on March 17, 1773 as a volunteer fire department known as the Rainbow Volunteer Fire Company. By 1914 the department had grown to include 14 separate volunteer companies. Today, the department operates out of 7 fire stations, including 1 EMS Station.

Beginning in April 2011 Engines 13 and 14 were disbanded due to budget cuts. Starting June 30, 2015 the city will also be disbanding its non-emergency transport division which had been available to assist in transporting those confined to a wheeled chair.

As of January 1, 2016, the department is now a fully career department.

As of February 12, 2020 the volunteer SCUBA team has been disbanded.

Stations and apparatus
, below is a complete list of the stations and apparatus. Staffing is only two (2) firefighters per apparatus.

References

Fire departments in Pennsylvania
Reading, Pennsylvania